Adama Soumaoro (born 18 June 1992) is a French professional footballer who plays as a centre-back for Serie A club Bologna.

Career
On 31 January 2020, Soumaoro joined Serie A club Genoa on loan with an option-to-buy. On 10 January 2021, he moved on another Italian loan, this time to Bologna. However, in contrary to his loan at Genoa, his loan at Bologna was made permanent. The reported fee was of €2.5 million.

Personal life 
Born in France, Soumaoro is of Malian descent.

Career statistics

Honours 
Lille

 Ligue 1: 2020–21

References

1992 births
Living people
People from Fontenay-aux-Roses
Footballers from Hauts-de-Seine
Association football defenders
French footballers
French people of Malian descent
Lille OSC players
Genoa C.F.C. players
Bologna F.C. 1909 players
Championnat National 2 players
Ligue 1 players
Serie A players
French expatriate footballers
French expatriate sportspeople in Italy
Expatriate footballers in Italy